CABI (in various spellings) is an abbreviation that may refer to:

 Centre for Agriculture and Bioscience International (CABI, sometimes also referred to as CAB International), a UK-based nonprofit inter-governmental organisation for scientific research and publishing on agriculture and the environment
 CaBI, the California Birth Index database
 CaBi, a common nickname for Capital Bikeshare

Cabi may also refer to:
 Câbi, an official in the Ottoman Empire
 Cabi (SNSD & 2PM song), a promotional song by SNSD &  2PM